Eastside Catholic School is a private Roman Catholic secondary school located in Sammamish, Washington, a suburb east of Seattle within the Archdiocese of Seattle. It has a faith-based educational program for students in grades 6 through 12.

Description
Founded by parents in 1980, the school is governed by an elected board of trustees. It is accredited by the state of Washington, the Northwest Association of Independent Schools. It is a member of the National Catholic Education Association and the Washington Federation of Independent Schools (WFIS). Eastside Catholic consists of a middle school, grades 6–8, with approximately 215 students, and a high school, grades 9–12, with approximately 646 students. The athletics mascot is the Crusader and the school colors are orange and navy blue. Eastside Catholic also offers an integrated special education program for high school students, the Options Program.

History

For the first nine years, the campus was south of the Bellevue Square mall, at the former Bellevue Junior High School (old Bellevue High), which is now the Downtown Park.

The next campus was also rented from the Bellevue School District at the former Ringdall Junior High (1970–87) at 11650 SE 60th Street in Newport Hills. Classes were held at that campus from 1981 to June 2008. In August 2008, Eastside Catholic opened a new $42 million campus in the city of Sammamish. The school also included an expansion to include grades 6–8. The Sammamish campus features a chapel and 2,000 seat athletics stadium.

The school made headlines when the resignation of vice-principal Mark Zmuda was announced in December 2013. Zmuda said he had been fired. Media reports said he was asked to resign because of his same-sex marriage in July 2014. Over 400 students conducted a sit-in protest in his support, with many teachers supporting the protest as well. The school stated in a letter to parents that "Mark's same-sex marriage over the summer violated his employment contract with the school" and that the school had been "directed to comply with the teachings of the church". Though many at the school advocated retaining Zmuda, the Archdiocese of Seattle maintained that Zmuda either needed to be terminated or the school would lose its credential as a Catholic institution.

In response to the student protest, the school administration stated that students would be sent home for any additional campus protests. This failed to quell the controversy, and on January 22, 2014, the president of the school, Sister Mary Tracy, resigned. The school board of trustees accepted her resignation, saying, "For Sister Mary it was a difficult but necessary decision so that a new leader can be brought in to ensure the entire Eastside Catholic community is on a positive path forward."

In August 2017, the school underwent another major disruption of its leadership. The overall principal of the school and the principal of the middle school were both dismissed, and 13 other faculty members resigned in response. Amid the dispute, an online petition was established that collected more than 400 signatures, calling for the dismissals to be reversed. The school's interim president, Father William Heric, and the two co-chairs of the board of trustees were reported to have fired the principals without the permission of the rest of the board of trustees. The two trustees who were blamed for the action then resigned and the board of trustees removed Heric from the position of interim president. Heric was also removed from his position as school chaplain and relocated to another Catholic church in the Seattle area. The dismissed principals and other faculty members were invited to return. The turmoil resulted in the school being unable to open on time for its fall session, so the start of classes was delayed by a week.

Sporting Championships
Eastside Catholic has won eleven state titles from 1984 to 2018: The cheerleading team has won various UCA national and world titles.
 1984: Girls Cross Country
 2010: Division II Girls Lacrosse
 2014: 3A Football
 2015: 3A Football
2016: Cheerleading Non-Tumbling
2016: Girls' Lacrosse
2017: Cheerleading Non-Tumbling
2017: Girls' Lacrosse
2017: Boys' Lacrosse – Private School 
2018: 3A Football
2019: 3A Football

Notable alumni
Matt Boyd, MLB player for the Detroit Tigers
Cal Towey, MLB player for the Miami Marlins.
Matisse Thybulle, NBA player for the Philadelphia 76ers and formerly for the Washington Huskies
Hunter Bryant, NFL player for the Detroit Lions
Erin Hawksworth, news anchor and former sports analyst for CNN

References

External links

Educational institutions established in 1980
1980 establishments in Washington (state)
Catholic secondary schools in Washington (state)
Schools in Sammamish, Washington
High schools in King County, Washington
Private middle schools in Washington (state)
Schools accredited by the Northwest Accreditation Commission
High schools within the Archdiocese of Seattle